The Saffir–Simpson hurricane wind scale (SSHWS) classifies hurricanes—which in the Western Hemisphere are tropical cyclones       that exceed the intensities of tropical depressions and tropical storms—into five categories distinguished by the intensities of their sustained winds. This measuring system was formerly known as the Saffir–Simpson hurricane scale, or SSHS.

To be classified as a hurricane, a tropical cyclone must have one-minute-average maximum sustained winds at 10 m above the surface of at least 74 mph (64 kn, 119 km/h; Category 1). The highest classification in the scale, Category 5, consists of storms with sustained winds of at least 157 mph (137 kn, 252 km/h). The classifications can provide some indication of the potential damage and flooding a hurricane will cause upon landfall.

The Saffir–Simpson hurricane wind scale is based on the highest wind speed averaged over a one-minute interval 10 m above the surface. Although the scale shows wind speeds in continuous speed ranges, the National Hurricane Center and the Central Pacific Hurricane Center assign tropical cyclone intensities in 5-knot (kn) increments (e.g., 100, 105, 110, 115 kn, etc.) because of the inherent uncertainty in estimating the strength of tropical cyclones. Wind speeds in knots are then converted to other units and rounded to the nearest 5 mph or 5 km/h.

The Saffir–Simpson hurricane wind scale is used officially only to describe hurricanes that form in the Atlantic Ocean and northern Pacific Ocean east of the International Date Line. Other areas use different scales to label these storms, which are called cyclones or typhoons, depending on the area. These areas (except the JTWC) use three-minute or ten-minute averaged winds to determine the maximum sustained wind speed, creating an important difference which frustrates direct comparison between maximum wind speeds of storms measured using the Saffir–Simpson hurricane wind scale (usually 14% more intense) and those measured using a ten-minute interval (usually 12% less intense).

There is some criticism of the SSHWS for not accounting for rain, storm surge, and other important factors, but SSHWS defenders say that part of the goal of SSHWS is to be straightforward and simple to understand.

History
The scale was developed in 1971 by civil engineer Herbert Saffir and meteorologist Robert Simpson, who at the time was director of the U.S. National Hurricane Center (NHC). The scale was introduced to the general public in 1973, and saw widespread use after Neil Frank replaced Simpson at the helm of the NHC in 1974.

The initial scale was developed by Herbert Saffir, a structural engineer, who in 1969 went on commission for the United Nations to study low-cost housing in hurricane-prone areas. While conducting the study, Saffir realized there was no simple scale for describing the likely effects of a hurricane. Mirroring the utility of the Richter magnitude scale for describing earthquakes, he devised a 1–5 scale based on wind speed that showed expected damage to structures. Saffir gave the scale to the NHC, and Simpson added the effects of storm surge and flooding.

In 2009, the NHC made moves to eliminate pressure and storm surge ranges from the categories, transforming it into a pure wind scale, called the Saffir–Simpson Hurricane Wind Scale (Experimental) [SSHWS]. The new scale became operational on May 15, 2010. The scale excludes flood ranges, storm surge estimations, rainfall, and location, which means a Category 2 hurricane that hits a major city will likely do far more cumulative damage than a Category 5 hurricane that hits a rural area. The agency cited various hurricanes as reasons for removing the "scientifically inaccurate" information, including Hurricane Katrina (2005) and Hurricane Ike (2008), which both had stronger than estimated storm surges, and Hurricane Charley (2004), which had weaker than estimated storm surge. Since being removed from the Saffir–Simpson hurricane wind scale, storm surge predicting and modeling is now handled with the use of computer numerical models such as ADCIRC and SLOSH.

In 2012, the NHC expanded the windspeed range for Category 4 by 1 mph in both directions, to 130–156 mph, with corresponding changes in the other units (113–136 kn, 209–251 km/h), instead of 131–155 mph (114–135 kn, 210–249 km/h). The NHC and the Central Pacific Hurricane Center assign tropical cyclone intensities in 5 knot increments, and then convert to mph and km/h with a similar rounding for other reports. So an intensity of 115 kn is rated Category 4, but the conversion to miles per hour (132.3 mph) would round down to 130 mph, making it appear to be a Category 3 storm. Likewise, an intensity of 135 kn (~155 mph, and thus Category 4) is 250.02 km/h, which, according to the definition used before the change would be Category 5. To resolve these issues, the NHC had been obliged to incorrectly report storms with wind speeds of 115 kn as 135 mph, and 135 kn as 245 km/h. The change in definition allows storms of 115 kn to be correctly rounded down to 130 mph, and storms of 135 kn to be correctly reported as 250 km/h, and still qualify as Category 4. Since the NHC had previously rounded incorrectly to keep storms in Category 4 in each unit of measure, the change does not affect the classification of storms from previous years. The new scale became operational on May 15, 2012.

Categories
The scale separates hurricanes into five different categories based on wind. The U.S. National Hurricane Center classifies hurricanes of Category 3 and above as major hurricanes, and the Joint Typhoon Warning Center classifies typhoons of 150 mph (241 km/h) or greater (strong Category 4 and Category 5) as super typhoons (although all tropical cyclones can be very dangerous). By contrast, the U.S. National Weather Service, Central Pacific Hurricane Center and the Joint Typhoon Warning Center define sustained winds as average winds over a period of one minute, measured at the same  height, and that is the definition used for this scale.

The scale is roughly logarithmic in wind speed.

The five categories are described in the following subsections, in order of increasing intensity. Intensity of example hurricanes is from both the time of landfall and the maximum intensity.

Category 1

Very dangerous winds will produce some damage

Category 1 storms usually cause no significant structural damage to most well-constructed permanent structures; however, they can topple unanchored mobile homes, as well as uproot or snap weak trees. Poorly attached roof shingles or tiles can blow off. Coastal flooding and pier damage are often associated with Category 1 storms. Power outages are typically widespread to extensive, sometimes lasting several days. Even though it is the least intense type of hurricane, they can still produce widespread damage and can be life-threatening storms.

Hurricanes that peaked at Category 1 intensity and made landfall at that intensity include: Juan (1985), Ismael (1995), Danny (1997), Stan (2005), Humberto (2007), Isaac (2012), Manuel (2013), Earl (2016), Nate (2017), Barry (2019), Lorena (2019), Hanna (2020), Isaias (2020), Gamma (2020), Nicholas (2021), Pamela (2021), Julia (2022), Lisa (2022) and Nicole (2022).

Category 2

Extremely dangerous winds will cause extensive damage

Storms of Category 2 intensity often damage roofing material (sometimes exposing the roof) and inflict damage upon poorly constructed doors and windows. Poorly constructed signs and piers can receive considerable damage and many trees are uprooted or snapped. Mobile homes, whether anchored or not, are typically damaged and sometimes destroyed, and many manufactured homes also suffer structural damage. Small craft in unprotected anchorages may break their moorings. Extensive to near-total power outages and scattered loss of potable water are likely, possibly lasting many days.

Hurricanes that peaked at Category 2 intensity and made landfall at that intensity include: Alice (1954), Ella (1958), Fifi (1974), Diana (1990), Gert (1993), Rosa (1994), Erin (1995), Alma (1996), Juan (2003), Alex (2010), Richard (2010), Tomas (2010), Carlotta (2012), Arthur (2014), Sally (2020), Olaf (2021), Rick (2021) and Agatha (2022).

Category 3

Devastating damage will occur

Tropical cyclones of Category 3 and higher are described as major hurricanes in the Atlantic or Eastern Pacific basins. These storms can cause some structural damage to small residences and utility buildings, particularly those of wood frame or manufactured materials with minor curtain wall failures. Buildings that lack a solid foundation, such as mobile homes, are usually destroyed, and gable-end roofs are peeled off. Manufactured homes usually sustain severe and irreparable damage. Flooding near the coast destroys smaller structures, while larger structures are struck by floating debris. A large number of trees are uprooted or snapped, isolating many areas. Additionally, terrain may be flooded well inland. Near-total to total power loss is likely for up to several weeks and water will likely also be lost or contaminated.

Hurricanes that peaked at Category 3 intensity and made landfall at that intensity include: Easy (1950), Carol (1954), Hilda (1955), Audrey (1957), Eloise (1975), Olivia (1975), Alicia (1983), Elena (1985), Roxanne (1995), Fran (1996), Isidore (2002), Jeanne (2004), Lane (2006), Karl (2010),   Otto (2016), Zeta (2020), and Grace (2021).

Category 4

Catastrophic damage will occur

Category 4 hurricanes tend to produce more extensive curtainwall failures, with some complete structural failure on small residences. Heavy, irreparable damage and near-complete destruction of gas station canopies and other wide span overhang type structures are common. Mobile and manufactured homes are often flattened. Most trees, except for the hardiest, are uprooted or snapped, isolating many areas. These storms cause extensive beach erosion, while terrain may be flooded far inland. Total and long-lived electrical and water losses are to be expected, possibly for many weeks.

The 1900 Galveston hurricane, the deadliest natural disaster to hit the United States, peaked at an intensity that corresponds to a modern-day Category 4 storm. Other examples of storms that peaked at Category 4 intensity and made landfall at that intensity include: Betsy (1965), Celia (1970), Carmen (1974), Frederic (1979), Joan (1988), Iniki (1992), Luis (1995), Iris (2001),
Charley (2004), Dennis (2005), Gustav (2008), Ike (2008), Joaquin (2015), Harvey (2017), Laura (2020), Eta (2020), Iota (2020),  Ida (2021), and Ian (2022).

Category 5

Catastrophic damage will occur

Category 5 is the highest category of the Saffir–Simpson scale. These storms cause complete roof failure on many residences and industrial buildings, and some complete building failures with small utility buildings blown over or away. The collapse of many wide-span roofs and walls, especially those with no interior supports, is common. Very heavy and irreparable damage to many wood-frame structures and total destruction to mobile/manufactured homes is prevalent. They include office, condominium and apartment buildings and hotels that are of solid concrete or steel frame construction, multi-story concrete parking garages, and residences that are made of either reinforced brick or concrete/cement block and have hipped roofs with slopes of no less than 35 degrees from horizontal and no overhangs of any kind, and if the windows are either made of hurricane-resistant safety glass or covered with shutters. Unless most of these requirements are met, the catastrophic destruction of a structure may occur.

The storm's flooding causes major damage to the lower floors of all structures near the shoreline, and many coastal structures can be completely flattened or washed away by the storm surge. Virtually all trees are uprooted or snapped and some may be debarked, isolating most affected communities. Massive evacuation of residential areas may be required if the hurricane threatens populated areas. Total and extremely long-lived power outages and water losses are to be expected, possibly for up to several months.

Historical examples of storms that made landfall at Category 5 status include: "Cuba" (1924), "Okeechobee" (1928), "Bahamas" (1932), "Cuba–Brownsville" (1933), "Labor Day" (1935), Janet (1955), Inez (1966), Camille (1969), Edith (1971), Anita (1977), David (1979), Gilbert (1988), Andrew (1992), Dean (2007), Felix (2007), Irma (2017), Maria (2017), Michael (2018), and Dorian (2019). No Category 5 hurricane is known to have made landfall at that strength in the eastern Pacific basin.

Criticism
Some scientists, including Kerry Emanuel and Lakshmi Kantha, have criticized the scale as being simplistic, indicating that the scale takes into account neither the physical size of a storm nor the amount of precipitation it produces. Additionally, they and others point out that the Saffir–Simpson scale, unlike the moment magnitude scale used to measure earthquakes, is not continuous, and is quantized into a small number of categories. Proposed replacement classifications include the Hurricane Intensity Index, which is based on the dynamic pressure caused by a storm's winds, and the Hurricane Hazard Index, which is based on surface wind speeds, the radius of maximum winds of the storm, and its translational velocity. Both of these scales are continuous, akin to the Richter scale; however, neither of these scales have been used by officials.

Proposed extensions
Fresh calls were made for consideration of the issue after Hurricane Irma in 2017, which was the subject of a number of seemingly credible false news reports as a "Category 6" storm, partly in consequence of so many local politicians using the term. Only a few storms of this intensity have been recorded. Occasionally, suggestions of using even higher wind speeds as the cutoff have been made.

According to Robert Simpson, there are no reasons for a Category 6 on the Saffir–Simpson Scale because it is designed to measure the potential damage of a hurricane to human-made structures. Simpson stated that "... when you get up into winds in excess of  you have enough damage if that extreme wind sustains itself for as much as six seconds on a building it's going to cause rupturing damages that are serious no matter how well it's engineered." Nonetheless, the counties of Broward and Miami-Dade in Florida have building codes that require that critical infrastructure buildings be able to withstand Category 5 winds.

See also

 Beaufort scaleRelates wind speed to observable conditions at sea and on land
 Enhanced Fujita scale – For tornado intensity with damage correlated to wind speeds. The system was also intended for applicability in hurricanes, and is utilized by engineers in hurricane damage assessment.
 Hurricane engineering
 Hypercane
 List of tropical cyclones
 Rohn Emergency Scale for measuring the magnitude (intensity) of any emergency

References

External links
 
 
 

Hazard scales
Tropical cyclone meteorology
Wind
Atlantic hurricanes
Pacific hurricanes
1973 introductions
Scales in meteorology